John Miguel Warwick Chipman  (born February 1957) is a British international relations expert, specialising in international security. He is director-general and chief executive of the International Institute for Strategic Studies. He was appointed a Companion of the Order of St Michael and St George (CMG) in the Queen Elizabeth's Birthday Honours list of 1999. Chipman has a BA (Hons) degree from Harvard University, an MA from the London School of Economics and an MPhil and DPhil from Balliol College, University of Oxford.

Selected works
 French Military Policy and African Security. London: International Institute for Strategic Studies (1985). .
 NATO's Southern Allies: Internal and External Challenges. London: Routledge (1988). .
 French Power in Africa. Oxford: Blackwell (1989). .

References

External links
Global Strategic Review 2013: Dr John Chipman.

British chief executives
Harvard University alumni
Living people
1957 births
Alumni of Balliol College, Oxford
Alumni of the London School of Economics
International relations scholars